Mudikandam  is a village in the Srirangam taluk of Tiruchirappalli district in Tamil Nadu, India.

Demographics 

As per the 2001 census, Mudikandam had a population of 898 with 437 males and 461 females. The sex ratio was 1,055 and the literacy rate, 45.18.

References 

 

Villages in Tiruchirappalli district